Akatsuka may refer to:

Akatsuka Botanical Garden, public garden in Japan
Akatsuka Station (disambiguation), several train stations in Japan
Akatsuka (surname)